Stan Billington (1937 – 2011) was an English footballer, who played as a full back in the Football League for Tranmere Rovers.

References

External links

Tranmere Rovers F.C. players
Everton F.C. players
Altrincham F.C. players
Association football fullbacks
English Football League players
1937 births
2011 deaths
English footballers